INS Nicobar, is a . These ships are large, multi-role troopships converted from merchant ships which were originally ordered by the Ministry of Shipping for service with the Shipping Corporation of India. These were later acquired by the Indian Navy for troop transport duties. The ship has large davits for Landing Craft Vehicle Personnel (LCVP) and also features high bridge forward, funnel in the aft, and a helicopter platform at the stern. This makes the vessel suitable for general purpose roles, other than just troop transport.

See also
List of active Indian Navy ships

References

Troop ships of India
1991 ships